Ottone and his son Acerbo Morena (died 1167) of Lodi were Italian chroniclers who wrote in Latin of twelfth-century events from a Lombard point of view in a history of Lodi, De rebus Laudensibus, ("Concerning Lodi") which was begun by Ottone. Acerbo died in the outbreak of plague that attended the disorders when Frederick Barbarossa's army took possession of Rome in July 1167. The chronicle includes verbal portraits of numerous contemporaries, including  Frederick Barbarossa. Their chronicle found an anonymous continuator whose work is generally appended to theirs.

References
F. Güterbock, "Ottone e Acerbo Morena," Arch. stor. ital., s. VII, XIII (1930)
Archivio Storico Lodigiano XXIII, s. II, 1975. Issue devoted to Ottone and Acerbo Morena, with cobntributions by A. Caretta and F. Guterbock.

Morena, Ottone and Acerbo